Jacob Fischer (April 11, 1871 – August 25, 1936) was an American labor union leader.

Born in Osborn, Ohio, Fischer moved to Indianapolis when he was 16.  There, he became a baker, then a printer, before finally training as a barber.  He joined the Journeymen Barbers' International Union of America.  In 1894, he was elected as vice-president of the union, then as president in 1898.  He became an organizer for the union in 1902, then in 1904, was elected as secretary-treasurer.

From 1918, Fischer served as a vice-president of the American Federation of Labor, and he also became a vice-president of the Union Label Department.  He retired in 1929, and died seven years later.

References

1871 births
1936 deaths
American trade union leaders
Trade unionists from Ohio